Olivia Smart (born 1 April 1997) is a British-Spanish ice dancer who most recently skated for Spain with Adrián Díaz. With Díaz, Smart was the 2021 Skate Canada International bronze medalist, a four-time Challenger Series medalist, and a three-time Spanish national champion. She represented Spain at the 2022 Winter Olympics.

With former partner Joseph Buckland, she is a three-time British national junior champion (2012–14), and competed at three World Junior Championships, reaching the top ten in 2014.

Personal life 
Olivia Smart was born on 1 April 1997 in Sheffield, England. She became a Spanish citizen in July 2017.

Skating career

Partnership with Buckland 
Smart teamed up with Joseph Buckland in 2010. They made their JGP debut in autumn 2011, ranking thirteenth in Austria and twelfth in Estonia. They came in seventeenth at their first World Junior Championships, held in Minsk in March 2012. In the 2012–2013 season, the duo missed the JGP series and finished twenty-second at the 2013 World Junior Championships in Milan.

In 2013–2014, Smart/Buckland placed seventh at both of their JGP assignments, Poland and the Czech Republic, and finished tenth at the 2014 World Junior Championships in Sofia, Bulgaria.

Smart/Buckland moved to the senior level in the 2014–2015 season. In October 2014, they placed fourth at the Ondrej Nepela Trophy, an ISU Challenger Series event. In November, they won silver medals at the International Cup of Nice and NRW Trophy before taking the British national title in the absence of longstanding champions Coomes/Buckland. Smart/Buckland withdrew from the 2015 European Championships before the short dance, Buckland having fallen ill with gastroenteritis. The duo went on to place twenty-seventh at the 2015 World Championships in Shanghai, China. Following that season, they split.

2016–2017 season: Debut of Smart/Díaz 
On 13 December 2015, it was announced that Smart had teamed up with Spanish ice dancer Adrián Díaz and that they wished to represent Spain. On 15 January 2016, Smart announced that the British skating association had released her and that she and Díaz would train in Montreal, Quebec, Canada, under Marie-France Dubreuil, Patrice Lauzon, and Romain Haguenauer.

Making their international debut, Smart/Díaz took silver behind Pogrebinsky/Benoit at the Lake Placid Ice Dance International in late July 2016. They later competed at three ISU Challenger Series events, placing fourth at the 2016 U.S. International Classic, sixth at the 2016 CS Autumn Classic International, and sixth at the 2016 CS Finlandia Trophy, before winning gold at the Open d'Andorra.

Smart/Díaz finished second to Hurtado/Khaliavin at the Spanish Championships. As a result, they were not nominated for the 2017 European Championships.

Smart/Díaz took silver in February at the Bavarian Open. Later that month, Federación Española Deportes de Hielo (FEDH) selected them to compete at the 2017 World Championships, the main Olympic-qualifying competition. The two placed sixteenth in the short dance, nineteenth in the free dance, and eighteenth overall at the event in Helsinki, Finland. Their result allowed Spain to send one ice dancing team to the Olympics.

2017–2018 season 
In July 2017, FEDH announced that Spain's Olympic spot would go to the team which received the highest combined score at the 2017 CS Golden Spin of Zagreb and Spanish Championships.

Smart/Díaz began their season on the Challenger Series, placing seventh at the 2017 U.S. International Figure Skating Classic and fourth at the 2017 Autumn Classic International. Making their Grand Prix debut, they placed sixth at the 2017 Skate Canada International in October. In December, they placed fifth at the 2017 CS Golden Spin of Zagreb, scoring 4.18 points less than Hurtado/Khaliavin. Later that month, they won the Spanish national title by a 3.23-point margin, resulting in a final deficit of 0.95 points. On 17 December 2017, FEDH announced that Hurtado/Khaliavin would compete at the European Championships and Olympics while Smart/Díaz would be assigned to the 2018 World Championships. They finished twelfth at the event in Milan, Italy.

2018–2019 season 
Smart/Díaz began their season at the Autumn Classic International Challenger Series event, where they placed second behind Canadians Weaver/Poje.  At the onset of the 2018–19 season, they were assigned to two Grand Prix events, the Skate Canada and Internationaux de France, finishing fifth at the former and seventh at the latter.

After winning the silver medal at the Spanish Championships, finishing behind Hurtado/Khaliavin, they placed eighth at the 2019 European Championships.

2019–2020 season 
Smart/Díaz began the season with a victory at the 2019 Lake Placid Ice Dance International and then placed fourth at the 2019 CS Autumn Classic International.  At their first Grand Prix assignment, 2019 Skate America, they placed fourth, with three new personal bests set.  Smart/Díaz concluded the Grand Prix with another fourth-place finish at the 2019 Internationaux de France.

After winning the Spanish national title for the second time, they finished eighth at the 2020 European Championships, below Hurtado/Khaliavin in seventh place. Despite this, they were assigned to compete at the World Championships in Montreal, but these were cancelled as a result of the COVID-19 pandemic.

2020–2021 season 
Smart/Díaz were assigned to the 2020 Skate Canada International, but this event was also cancelled due to the pandemic.

While Smart/Díaz were listed on the preliminary entry list for the 2021 World Championships, the Spanish Ice Sports Federation announced on March 2 that the final determination as to which team would represent Spain would be made following a virtual skate-off between them and Hurtado/Khaliavin.  On March 7, the Spanish federation announced that the berth had been awarded to Hurtado/Khaliavin.

2021–2022 season: Beijing Olympics 
Smart/Díaz began the Olympic season at the 2021 CS Autumn Classic International, where they won the silver medal, setting new personal best scores in the free dance and overall in the process. They beat domestic rivals Hurtado/Khaliavin by 0.25 points in the first of three matchups to determine which team would be named to the Spanish Olympic team at their second event, the 2021 CS Finlandia Trophy.

Competing on the Grand Prix at the 2021 Skate America, they placed fourth in the rhythm dance, 1.27 points behind Canadian training partners Fournier Beaudry/Sørensen. They came third in the free dance but remained fourth overall by 0.54 points. Their Zorro free dance received a standing ovation from the audience, with Smart commenting that the "reaction of the crowd made it all worthwhile and so memorable." The following week at their second Grand Prix, 2021 Skate Canada International, they were third in both segments of the competition, winning the bronze medal, their first Grand Prix medal. 

Smart/Díaz faced off against Hurtado/Khaliavin at the 2022 Spanish Championships and won both segments of the competition to take the gold medal with a score of 202.47, with a margin of 8.12 points over their silver medalist rivals, expanding their cumulative margin to 8.37 points. Both teams then went to the 2022 European Championships, the third and final competition for the Spanish Olympic berth. Smart/Díaz were fifth in the rhythm dance and moved up to fourth overall with a fourth-place free dance, despite a technical fall on their ending pose. Smart remarked that this season was "the hardest we've ever worked for anything. It's not only been this competition; it has been the whole season that we gave everything we had." Hurtado/Khaliavin finished in sixth place, 4.96 points back. With a cumulative margin of 13.33 points, Smart/Díaz were subsequently named to Spain's Olympic team.

Competing at the 2022 Winter Olympics in the dance event, Smart/Díaz placed ninth in the rhythm dance. They skated a new personal best in the free dance, breaking 120 points in the segment for the first time with a score of 121.41. Due to errors by higher-ranked teams Fournier Beaudry/Sørensen, Gilles/Poirier and Stepanova/Bukin they were sixth in that segment and rose to eighth overall.

Smart/Díaz finished their season at the 2022 World Championships, held in Montpellier. Russian dance teams were absent due to the International Skating Union banning all Russian athletes due to their country's invasion of Ukraine. They finished seventh, the highest ever result for a Spanish team, and finally achieving the Spanish federation's long-desired goal of earning two berths for Spanish dance teams at the World Championships.

On May 23, the Spanish federation announced that Díaz was retiring from competition. They indicated that Smart would "follow a new sporting path" with the federation. In December 2022, it was announced that Smart had teamed up with German ice dancer Tim Dieck.

Programs

With Diaz

With Buckland

Competitive highlights 
GP: Grand Prix; CS: Challenger Series; JGP: Junior Grand Prix

With Díaz for Spain

With Buckland for the United Kingdom

Detailed results

Small medals for short and free programs awarded only at ISU Championships.

With Díaz for Spain

References

External links 

 
 

1997 births
Living people
Sportspeople from Sheffield
Spanish female ice dancers
British female ice dancers
English female ice dancers
English emigrants to Spain
21st-century Spanish dancers
21st-century British dancers
British expatriates in Spain
21st-century English women
21st-century English people
Figure skaters at the 2022 Winter Olympics
Olympic figure skaters of Spain